Extended Player One is the debut EP from Kids Near Water, as well as the band's first release on Firefly Recordings. The EP was recorded by former Understand member John Hannon in Essex across one weekend in September 2000 at Mushroom Studios, Southend. On its release the EP was awarded 5 K's in Kerrang! as well as receiving a favourable review in the NME. Monk Dave, Editor of the UK punk-zine Fracture described the release as "quite simply the best demo I have ever heard".

Track listing
All words and music by Kids Near Water

 "Some Free Advice"
 "When It Comes to You, I Step on Cracks"	
 "Post Scriptum"	
 "Telegram"	
 "Gone"

Personnel
Brian Reed – lead vocals, guitar
Simon Joyce – guitars, vocals
John Astbury – bass guitar
Nik Finch – drums
John Hannon – production

References

2001 debut EPs